Backwaters is an album by American guitarist Tony Rice, released in 1982. It is credited to The Tony Rice Unit.

Track listing 
 "Common Ground" (Tony Rice) – 7:39  
 "Just Some Bar In The French Quarters" (Rice) – 3:02  
 "Backwaters" (Rice) – 6:08  
 "My Favorite Things" (Oscar Hammerstein II, Richard Rodgers) – 5:14  
 "A Child is Born" (Dave Grusin) – 3:34  
 "On Green Dolphin Street" (Bronisław Kaper, Ned Washington) – 3:33  
 "Mobius Mambo" (Rice) – 5:27

Personnel 
 Tony Rice – guitar
 Wyatt Rice – guitar
 John Reischman – mandolin
 Fred Carpenter – violin
 Richard Greene – violin
 Todd Phillips – bass

Production Notes 
Producer – Anthony Rice
Recording Engineer – Bob Shumaker
Recording Studio – 1750 Arch Studios, Berkeley, CA
Recorded – March 1982

References 

1982 albums
Tony Rice albums
Rounder Records albums